Tetsuya Tanaka (田中哲也, Tanaka Tetsuya, born 16 December 1965) is a Japanese racing driver. Since 1996 he has competed in the Japanese Grand Touring Championship for a variety of teams, and has won the Tokachi 24 Hours five times.

Racing record

Complete JGTC/Super GT results
(key) (Races in bold indicate pole position) (Races in italics indicate fastest lap)

References

External links
Official website 

1965 births
Living people
Japanese racing drivers
Formula Nippon drivers
Super GT drivers
Asian Le Mans Series drivers
Nismo drivers
Dandelion Racing drivers
Japanese Touring Car Championship drivers
Nakajima Racing drivers
TOM'S drivers
Nürburgring 24 Hours drivers